Edward Poles (1902 – February 1, 1932), nicknamed "Possum" and "Googles", was an American Negro league infielder in the 1920s.

A native of Virginia, Poles made his Negro leagues debut in 1920 for the Baltimore Black Sox. He went on to play for Baltimore again from 1922 to 1924, and also made appearances for the Richmond Giants in 1922. Poles finished his career with the Harrisburg Giants in 1928. He died in Glen Burnie, Maryland in 1932 at age 29 or 30.

References

External links
 and Baseball-Reference Black Baseball stats and Seamheads

1902 births
Place of birth missing
Date of birth missing
1932 deaths
Baltimore Black Sox players
Harrisburg Giants players
Richmond Giants players
20th-century African-American sportspeople
Baseball infielders